This article contains the results of the 1972 Iranian local elections.

County councils

Educational councils 
Source: Ministry of Interior

References 

Election results in Iran